Hemiarcha thermochroa is a moth of the family Gelechiidae. It is known from Australia, where it has been recorded from the Australian Capital Territory, Victoria and South Australia.

Adults have orange forewings with black spots and bands, and a black margin.

References

Moths described in 1893
Hemiarcha